Jai Bhagwan (born 11 May 1985), is a two-time Asian Championships medallist and a bronze winner at the 2010 Commonwealth Games who also represented India in Boxing in the lightweight (60 kg) division at the 2012 London Olympics.

Bhagwan qualified for the London Games by reaching the quarterfinals of the 2011 World Amateur Boxing Championships in Baku. He was coached by the Indian Boxing Coach Gurbaksh Singh Sandhu.

In 2011, he appeared in reality game show, hosted by Shahrukh Khan called Zor Ka Jhatka: Total Wipeout and was one of the finalists.

At the 2012 Summer Olympics, in a dominating performance, he thrashed Andrique Allisop of Seychelles 18—8 in the opening round on 29 July 2012. On 2 August 2012, Jai Bhagwan lost to Kazakh fighter Gani Zhailauov at the London Olympics in the last 16.

References

External links
 Jai Bhagwan, Profile International Boxing Association

Indian male boxers
1985 births
Living people
People from Bhiwani
People from Hisar district
Boxers from Haryana
Olympic boxers of India
Contestants on Indian game shows
Boxers at the 2012 Summer Olympics
Boxers at the 2010 Commonwealth Games
Commonwealth Games bronze medallists for India
Place of birth missing (living people)
Boxers at the 2006 Asian Games
Commonwealth Games medallists in boxing
Asian Games competitors for India
Lightweight boxers
Recipients of the Arjuna Award
Medallists at the 2010 Commonwealth Games